"Tempted to Touch" is a song by Barbadian soca musician Rupee. The song was first released in 2002 on the VP Records sublabel Waist Line Muzik, backed with the song's riddim, "The Grippa Riddim". It also appeared on the compilation album Soca Gold 2003 before getting a slightly different sound for its 2004 single release. Upon its release, the song reached number 44 on the UK Singles Chart, number 39 on the US Billboard Hot 100, and number 32 on the French Singles Chart.

A reggaeton remix of the song features Daddy Yankee. The song was included on Billboard's "12 Best Dancehall & Reggaeton Choruses of the 21st Century" at number five.

Charts

Release history

References

2002 songs
2004 singles
Atlantic Records singles
Barbadian songs
Daddy Yankee songs
Reggaeton songs
Soca songs